Prostanthera, commonly known as mintbush or mint bush, is a genus of about 100 species of flowering plants in the mint family Lamiaceae, and all are endemic to Australia. Plants are usually shrubs, rarely trees with leaves in opposite pairs. The flowers are arranged in panicles in the leaf axils or on the ends of branchlets. The sepals are joined at the base with two lobes. The petals are usually blue to purple or white, joined in a tube with two "lips", the lower lip with three lobes and the upper lip with two lobes or notched.

Description
Plants in the genus Prostanthera are usually shrubs or subshrubs, rarely trees, with leaves arranged in opposite pairs. The flowers are arranged in panicles in leaf axils or on the ends of branchlets with bracts and bracteoles at the base. The sepals are joined at the base but with two lobes. The petals form a tube with two lips, the lower lip with three, usually spreading lobes and the upper lip with two lobes or a notch at the tip. The petal tube is bluish purple to white or more or less red. There are four stamens, the anthers often with a small appendage. The ovary has four lobes and the tip of the stigma has two branches.

Taxonomy
The genus Prostanthera was first formally described in 1806 by Jacques Labillardière in his book Novae Hollandiae Plantarum Specimen and the first species he described was Prostanthera lasianthos. The word is derived from the Greek for an appendage. Within the flowers are small spur-like appendages on the anthers.

Ecology
Prostanthera species are used as food plants by the larvae of hepialid moths of the genus Aenetus including A. eximia and A. ligniveren.

Uses
Mint bushes are cultivated as ornamentals and for essential oils and spices.

Species list
The following is a list of species accepted at the Australian Plant Census as at August 2020:

 Prostanthera albiflora B.J.Conn (W.A.)
 Prostanthera albohirta C.T.White (Qld.)
 Prostanthera althoferi  B.J.Conn (W.A., N.T., S.A.)
 Prostanthera althoferi B.J.Conn subsp. althoferi (W.A.)
 Prostanthera althoferi subsp. longifolia B.J.Conn (N.T., S.A.)
 Prostanthera ammophila B.J.Conn (S.A.)
 Prostanthera arapilensis M.L.Williams, Drinnan & N.G.Walsh (Vic.)
 Prostanthera askania B.J.Conn (N.S.W.) – tranquility mint-bush 
 Prostanthera aspalathoides A.Cunn. ex Benth. (S.A., N.S.W., Vic.) – scarlet mint-bush
 Prostanthera athertoniana  B.J.Conn & T.C.Wilson (Qld.)
 Prostanthera baxteri A.Cunn. ex Benth. (W.A.)
 Prostanthera behriana Schltdl. (S.A.)
 Prostanthera caerulea R.Br. (N.S.W.) – lilac mint-bush
 Prostanthera calycina F.Muell. ex Benth. (S.A.) – west coast mint-bush
 Prostanthera campbellii F.Muell. (W.A.)
 Prostanthera canaliculata F.Muell. (W.A.)
 Prostanthera carrickiana B.J.Conn (W.A.) – Carrick's mintbush
 Prostanthera centralis B.J.Conn (W.A., N.T.)
 Prostanthera chlorantha (F.Muell.) F.Muell. ex Benth. (S.A.) – green mintbush
 Prostanthera cineolifera R.T.Baker & H.G.Sm. (N.S.W.) – Singleton mint bush
 Prostanthera clotteniana (F.M.Bailey.) A.R.Bean (Qld.)
 Prostanthera collina Domin (Qld.)
 Prostanthera conniana  T.C.Wilson (N.S.W.)
 Prostanthera cruciflora J.H.Willis (N.S.W.)
 Prostanthera cryptandroides A.Cunn. ex Benth. (Qld., N.S.W.)- Wollemi mint-bush
 Prostanthera cryptandroides A.Cunn. ex Benth. subsp. cryptandroides (N.S.W.) – Wollemi mint-bush
 Prostanthera cryptandroides subsp. euphrasioides (Benth.) B.J.Conn (Qld., N.S.W.)
 Prostanthera cuneata Benth. (N.S.W.) – alpine mint-bush
 Prostanthera decussata F.Muell. (N.S.W., A.C.T., Vic.) – dense mintbush
 Prostanthera densa A.A.Ham. (N.S.W.) – villous mint-bush
 Prostanthera denticulata R.Br. (N.S.W., Vic.) – rough mint-bush
 Prostanthera discolor R.T.Baker (N.S.W.)
 Prostanthera eckersleyana F.Muell. (W.A.) – crinkly mint-bush
 Prostanthera eungella B.J.Conn & K.M.Proft (Qld.)
 Prostanthera eurybioides F.Muell. (S.A.) – Monarto mint-bush
 Prostanthera ferricola B.J.Conn & K.A.Sheph. (W.A.)
 Prostanthera florifera B.J.Conn (S.A.) – Gawler Ranges mintbush
 Prostanthera galbraithiae B.J.Conn (Vic.) – Wellington mint-bush
 Prostanthera gilesii  Althofer ex B.J.Conn & T.C.Wilson (N.S.W.)
 Prostanthera granitica Maiden & Betche  (Qld., N.S.W.) – granite mint-bush
 Prostanthera grylloana F.Muell. (W.A.)
 Prostanthera hindii B.J.Conn (N.S.W.)
 Prostanthera hirtula F.Muell. ex Benth. (N.S.W., Vic.)
 Prostanthera howelliae Blakely (N.S.W.)
 Prostanthera incana A.Cunn. ex Benth. (N.S.W., Vic.) - velvet mint-bush
 Prostanthera incisa R.Br. (Qld., N.S.W., Vic.) – cut-leaved mint-bush
 Prostanthera incurvata B.J.Conn (W.A.)
 Prostanthera junonis B.J.Conn (N.S.W.)
 Prostanthera lanceolata Domin (N.S.W.)
 Prostanthera laricoides B.J.Conn (W.A.)
 Prostanthera lasianthos Labill. (Qld., N.S.W., A.C.T., Vic., Tas.) – Victorian Christmas bush
 Prostanthera leichhardtii Benth. (Qld.)
 Prostanthera linearis R.Br. (Qld., N.S.W.) – narrow-leaved mint-bush
 Prostanthera lithospermoides F.Muell. (Qld.)
 Prostanthera magnifica C.A.Gardner (W.A.) – magnificent mint-bush
 Prostanthera makinsonii B.J.Conn & T.C.Wilson (N.S.W.)
 Prostanthera marifolia R.Br. (N.S.W.) – Seaforth mint-bush
 Prostanthera megacalyx C.T.White & W.D.Francis (Qld.)
 Prostanthera melissifolia F.Muell. (N.S.W., Vic.) –  balm mint-bush
 Prostanthera monticola B.J.Conn (N.S.W., Vic.) – monkey mint-bush, buffalo mint-bush
 Prostanthera mulliganensis B.J.Conn & T.C.Wilson (Qld.)
 Prostanthera nanophylla B.J.Conn (W.A.)
 Prostanthera nivea A.Cunn. ex Benth. (Qld., N.S.W., Vic.) – snowy mint-bush
 Prostanthera nivea var. induta Benth. (N.S.W.)
 Prostanthera nivea A.Cunn. ex Benth. var. nivea (N.S.W., Vic.)
 Prostanthera nudula J.M.Black ex E.L.Robertson (S.A.)
 Prostanthera oleoides T.C.Wilson & B.J.Conn (Qld.)
 Prostanthera ovalifolia R.Br. (Qld., N.S.W., Vic.) – mint bush
 Prostanthera palustris B.J.Conn (N.S.W.)
 Prostanthera parvifolia Domin (Qld.)
 Prostanthera patens B.J.Conn (W.A.)
 Prostanthera pedicellata B.J.Conn (W.A.)
 Prostanthera petraea B.J.Conn (Qld., N.S.W.)
 Prostanthera petrophila B.J.Conn (W.A.)
 Prostanthera phylicifolia F.Muell. (Qld., N.S.W., A.C.T., Vic.) – spiked mint-bush
 Prostanthera porcata B.J.Conn (N.S.W.)
 Prostanthera prostantheroides (F.Muell.) T.C.Wilson, M.J.Henwood & B.J.Conn (W.A.)
 Prostanthera prunelloides R.Br. (N.S.W.)
 Prostanthera rhombea  R.Br. (N.S.W., Vic.) - sparkling mint-bush
 Prostanthera ringens Benth. (Qld., N.S.W.) – gaping mint-bush
 Prostanthera rotundifolia R.Br. (N.S.W., Vic., Tas.) – round-leaf mint-bush
 Prostanthera rugosa A.Cunn. ex Benth. (N.S.W.)
 Prostanthera saxicola R.Br. (Qld., N.S.W., Vic.)
 Prostanthera saxicola var. bracteolata J.H.Willis (Qld., N.S.W., Vic.)
 Prostanthera saxicola var. major Benth. (Qld., N.S.W.)
 Prostanthera saxicola var. montana A.A.Ham. (N.S.W.)
 Prostanthera saxicola R.Br. var. saxicola (N.S.W.)
 Prostanthera schultzii F.Muell. ex Tate (N.T.)
 Prostanthera scutata C.A.Gardner (W.A.)
 Prostanthera scutellarioides (R.Br.) Briq. (N.S.W.)
 Prostanthera sejuncta M.L.Williams, Drinnan & N.G.Walsh (N.S.W.)
 Prostanthera semiteres B.J.Conn (W.A.)
 Prostanthera semiteres subsp. intricata B.J.Conn (W.A.)
 Prostanthera semiteres B.J.Conn subsp. semiteres (W.A.)
 Prostanthera sericea (J.M.Black) B.J.Conn (W.A., N.T., S.A.)
 Prostanthera serpyllifolia (R.Br.) Briq. (W.A., S.A., N.S.W., Vic.) – small-leaved mint-bush
 Prostanthera serpyllifolia subsp. microphylla (R.Br.) B.J.Conn (N.S.W., S.A., Vic., W.A.)
 Prostanthera serpyllifolia (R.Br.) Briq. subsp. serpyllifolia (S.A., W.A.)
 Prostanthera spinosa F.Muell. (S.A., Vic.) – spiny mint-bush
 Prostanthera splendens B.J.Conn (W.A.)
 Prostanthera staurophylla F.Muell. (N.S.W.)
 Prostanthera stenophylla B.J.Conn (N.S.W.)
 Prostanthera striatiflora F.Muell. (W.A., N.T., S.A., N.S.W.)
 Prostanthera stricta R.T.Baker (N.S.W.) – Mount Vincent mint-bush
 Prostanthera suborbicularis C.T.White & W.D.Francis (Qld.)
 Prostanthera tallowa B.J.Conn & T.C.Wilson (N.S.W.)
 Prostanthera teretifolia Maiden & Betche (N.S.W.) – turpentine mint-bush
 Prostanthera tozerana B.J.Conn & T.C.Wilson (Qld.)
 Prostanthera tysoniana (Carrick) B.J.Conn (W.A.)
 Prostanthera verticillaris B.J.Conn (W.A.)
 Prostanthera violacea R.Br. (N.S.W.) – violet mint-bush
 Prostanthera walteri F.Muell. (N.S.W., Vic.) – blotchy mint-bush
 Prostanthera wilkieana F.Muell. (W.A., N.T., S.A.)

References

 
Lamiales of Australia
Lamiaceae genera
Taxa named by Jacques Labillardière